The Hyundai WIA (Hyundai World Industrial Ace) is a member of the Hyundai Motor Group and is the second biggest automotive parts manufacturer in South Korea. As one of the core companies of Hyundai Motor Group, it is supplying automobile engines, modules, C.V Joint and 4WD systems to automobile companies such as Hyundai, Kia, and Genesis. In addition, it is in charge of manufacturing and selling FA (Factory Automation) facilities, various large-caliber artillery, aircraft parts, robots, and press device. The main customers who earn most of their sales are Hyundai, Kia, Genesis, and the Ministry of National Defense.

On 10 August 2009, the company name was changed from WIA to Hyundai WIA to target the global market and increase brand competitiveness.

Business Area

Automotive
 Automotive parts
 Automotive module
 Automobile engine

Machinery
 CNC turning centers
SE-SY Series HD-Y Series HD2600 HD3100
 Machining centers
KF-B Series XF2000 XF8500
 FA (Factory automation)
 Robot

Defense
 Artillery
CN78 105 mm 38 caliber howitzer developed in 1978 CN79 155 mm 39 caliber howitzer developed in 1979 CN98 155 mm 52 caliber self-propelled howitzer developed in 1998 CN03 120 mm 44 caliber smoothbore gun developed in 2003 CN08 120 mm 55 caliber smoothbore gun developed in 2008
 Mortar
KM181 60 mm mortar developed in 1985 KM187 81 mm mortar developed in 1996 KMS114 81 mm mortar developed in 2019 XKM120 120 mm self-propelled mortar developed in 2019
 Recoilless Rifle
M67 recoilless rifle (Licensed production) M40 recoilless rifle (Licensed production)
 RCWS (Remote controlled weapon station)
RW01K
 Naval armament system
76 mm K-76L/62 naval gun developed in 2007 5”naval gun (Licensed production) 76 mm naval gun (Licensed production) 57 mm MK3 naval gun (Licensed production) 40 mm MK3 naval gun (Licensed production) 30 mm Goalkeeper CIWS (Licensed production)

 Aerospace system
Main & Nose landing gear Main rotor control Pilot seat Commercial airplane Landing gear

Business of heavy machinery
 Plant
 Press

Satellite

Global business
 Machinery business
 Automotive parts business
 Automotive engine business
 Components and materials business
 Molding business

References

External links 
 

Hyundai Motor Group
Auto parts suppliers of South Korea
Machine tool builders
Robotics companies
Companies based in Changwon
Manufacturing companies established in 1976
Defence companies of South Korea
South Korean companies established in 1976
Industrial robotics